Steven James Conran (born 12 May 1966) is an Australian professional golfer, who played on the Japan Golf Tour and the PGA Tour of Australasia. He won four times during his career; including the Epson Singapore Open in 1995 and the Hisamitsu-KBC Augusta in 2004.

Amateur wins
1989 Australian Amateur
1990 New South Wales Medal (tied with Matthew Ecob), New South Wales Amateur

Professional wins (4)

Japan Golf Tour wins (1)

Japan Golf Tour playoff record (0–1)

PGA Tour of Australasia wins (1)

Other wins (2)
1993 Nedlands Masters
1995 Vanuatu Open

Results in major championships

CUT = missed the halfway cut
Note: Conran only played in the U.S. Open.

Team appearances
Amateur
Sloan Morpeth Trophy (representing Australia): 1990 (winners)
Australian Men's Interstate Teams Matches (representing New South Wales): 1988, 1990 (winners)

References

External links

Profile at golflink.com

Australian male golfers
Japan Golf Tour golfers
People from the Central Tablelands
Sportsmen from New South Wales
1966 births
Living people